Coleophora botaurella is a moth of the family Coleophoridae. It is found in Russia (Volga region), Kazakhstan, Turkmenistan, Iran, Afghanistan and Turkey.

Adults are on wing from June to August.

References

botaurella
Moths of Europe
Moths of Asia